Chaetophthalmus is a genus of bristle flies in the family Tachinidae. There are at least 20 described species in Chaetophthalmus.

Species
These 27 species belong to the genus Chaetophthalmus:

 Chaetophthalmus alienus Cantrell, 1985 c g
 Chaetophthalmus argentifrons Cantrell & Shima, 1991 c g
 Chaetophthalmus aurifrons Cantrell & Shima, 1991 c g
 Chaetophthalmus bicolor (Macquart, 1848) c g
 Chaetophthalmus bicoloratus Cantrell & Shima, 1991 c g
 Chaetophthalmus brevigaster (Macquart, 1846) c g
 Chaetophthalmus collessi Cantrell, 1985 c g
 Chaetophthalmus dorsalis (Malloch, 1929) c g
 Chaetophthalmus flavocaudus Cantrell, 1985 c g
 Chaetophthalmus flavopilosus Cantrell, 1985 c g
 Chaetophthalmus formosioides Cantrell, 1985 c g
 Chaetophthalmus fullerae Cantrell, 1985 c g
 Chaetophthalmus gressitti Cantrell & Shima, 1991 c g
 Chaetophthalmus inconstans Cantrell & Shima, 1991 c g
 Chaetophthalmus innotatus Cantrell, 1985 c g
 Chaetophthalmus laticeps Cantrell & Shima, 1991 c g
 Chaetophthalmus longimentum Cantrell, 1985 c g
 Chaetophthalmus nitidus Cantrell & Shima, 1991 c g
 Chaetophthalmus occlusus Cantrell, 1985 c g
 Chaetophthalmus ruficeps (Macquart, 1847) c
 Chaetophthalmus sedlacekorum Cantrell & Shima, 1991 c g
 Chaetophthalmus setosus Cantrell, 1985 c g
 Chaetophthalmus shinonagai Cantrell & Shima, 1991 c g
 Chaetophthalmus similis Walker, 1853 c g
 Chaetophthalmus taylori Cantrell & Shima, 1991 c g
 Chaetophthalmus tonnoiri Cantrell, 1985 c g
 Chaetophthalmus wau Cantrell & Shima, 1991 c g

Data sources: i = ITIS, c = Catalogue of Life, g = GBIF, b = Bugguide.net

References

Further reading

External links

 
 

Tachinidae